Kiger Stadium, formerly known as Gem Stadium, is a baseball stadium in the Altamont area of Klamath Falls, Oregon, United States.

Construction began in late 1947 at the Crest Street site of Kiger Stadium, with a goal of opening in Spring 1948 for the Class D Klamath Falls Gems, the Far West League farm team of the Philadelphia Phillies. The stadium was built by Klamath Baseball, Inc. and paid for by the sale of stock to local citizens. The opening, and the original Gems, were a huge success, as the team led the league in attendance in three of the four years they were in the League, and won the Far West League's final Championship before the league folded after the 1951 season.

Since those days, the venerable stadium has stood against weather and other obstacles to become one of only two remaining all-wood stadiums in North America. Historic Kiger Stadium has hosted thousands of amateur baseball games, from Little League through American Legion through a semi-pro incarnation of the Gems, through the years. In 1968 the ballpark hosted the Babe Ruth World Series, and in 1970 the American Legion Championships.

For a time in the 1950s, Kiger Stadium was even turned into an auto racing track. Through the years Kiger has seen it all, and in 2011 welcomed the new Klamath Falls Gems of the West Coast League. The Gems gave Klamath Basin families another reason to visit Kiger Stadium, and the success of the Gems and the WCL have brought many improvements to Kiger, without losing the charm of the original park.  (The current Gems now play in the Great West League.)

In 2014 the Klamath Falls Gems, have planned minor improvements to Kiger Stadium, such as making the restrooms ADA accessible, and painting the outfield wall, the stadium facades, and stadium bleachers.

Names that played at Kiger Stadium
 Dick Young
 Don Ferrarese
 Niles Jordan
 Bob Bowman
 Troy Herriage
 Bert Convy

See also
 Nettleton Stadium
 Arcata Ball Park
 Harry & David Field
 Miles Field demolished in 2005
 Tiger Field
 Appeal-Democrat Park
 Travis Credit Union Park demolished 2008

References

Baseball venues in Oregon
1948 establishments in Oregon
Buildings and structures in Klamath County, Oregon
Sports venues completed in 1948
Minor league baseball venues